Muziekgebouw Frits Philips is a concert hall in Eindhoven, the Netherlands. The venue is named after Frits Philips and was opened in 1992.

External links
Official website

Buildings and structures in Eindhoven
Concert halls in the Netherlands
Music in Eindhoven